Sheyjan may refer to:
 Shijan
 Tuksar-e Shijan